The 1993 Macau Grand Prix Formula Three was the 40th Macau Grand Prix race to be held on the streets of Macau on 22 November 1993. It was the tenth edition for Formula Three cars.

Entry list

Race

References

External links
 The official website of the Macau Grand Prix

Macau Grand Prix
Grand
Macau
Macau Grand Prix